Honeymoon for Three is a 1915 British comedy film directed by Maurice Elvey.

Cast
 Charles Hawtrey as Prince Ferdinand
 Elisabeth Risdon as  Molly Van Dam
 Fred Groves as Cornelius V. Van Dam
 A. V. Bramble  as Duke of Monte Casa
 Ruth Mackay as Mme. Alova
 Compton Coutts as Detective
 M. Gray Murray
 Edith Evans

External links

1915 films
British black-and-white films
British silent feature films
Films directed by Maurice Elvey
1915 comedy films
British comedy films
1910s British films
Silent comedy films